Afro-Jordanians are Jordanians of Black African heritage. Afro-Jordanians speak Arabic and mostly adhere to Islam. Most Afro-Jordanians are concentrated in the Southwest parts of Jordan.

Notable Afro-Jordanians
 Abdallah Dghemaat, lead actor in the feature film Fish Above Sea Level
 Rasheim Wright, American-Jordanian basketball player
 Khalil Bani Attiah, Jordanian footballer

See also
 Afro-Arab

References

External links
Thaddeus Bell on Black Jordanians

Ethnic groups in Jordan
 
Jordanian
African diaspora in the Middle East
Ethnic groups in the Middle East
African diaspora in the Arab world